Khomo-Phatšoa is a community council located in the Qacha's Nek District of Lesotho. Its population in 2006 was 8,263.

Villages
The community of Khomo-Phatšoa includes the villages of

BelebeseHa ChabanaHa ChakaHa EdwardHa KatelaHa KhabanaHa MatapoleHa MavukaHa Moshebi

Ha MosiuoaHa SephelaneHa SetefaneHa SolojaKhomo-PhatšoaKoungLetlapengLibatengLikhameng

LikoebelengMafika-LisiuMakorotongMpharanePhahamengSehlabathebeSekoakoanengSemenyaneThamathu

Sehlabathebe National Park
The western part of Sehlabathebe National Park is bordered by a cluster of 14 villages which are part of the greater Khomo-Phatšoa Community Council - an area of 46ha managed as a managed resource area (MRA) with a community council endorsed natural and cultural heritage management plan.

References

External links
 Google map of community villages

Populated places in Qacha's Nek District